Greece participated with 39 athletes (19 men, 20 women) at the 2006 European Athletics Championships held in Gothenburg, Sweden.

Medals

Results

References 

2006
Nations at the 2006 European Athletics Championships
2006 in Greek sport